Frank Howe Sugg (11 January 1862 – 29 May 1933) was an English footballer and first-class cricketer. He played for England in two Test matches in 1888 and for three county cricket clubs – Yorkshire in 1883, Derbyshire from 1884 to 1886 and Lancashire from 1887 to 1899. He also played for five football clubs.

Cricket career
Sugg was born at Ilkeston, Derbyshire and became a solicitor's clerk and was living with his widowed mother at Nether Hallam in 1881. Though born in Derbyshire, he lived his early life in Yorkshire and made his first-class debut for Yorkshire in 1883. In the 1884 season, Sugg went to play for Derbyshire where he was top scorer for the club and regarded as the best bat in a team that suffered the rare ignominy of an anti-perfect season losing all ten of its county games. In the 1885 season, Sugg scored 187 against Hampshire at Southampton and was second in the averages to Ludford Docker. He was second in the averages in the 1886 season to William Chatterton.

With Derbyshire's fortunes declining, in 1887 he went to Lancashire, and it was during his term at Old Trafford that he appeared for England in two Test matches. In 1890 he was one of the "Nine Great Professional Batsmen" profiled in Wisden. Sugg scored 1000 runs in a season five times, all during his time with Lancashire. He was one of the first players (after James Southerton) to represent three teams in county cricket. His benefit match in 1897 raised 1000 pounds.

He was six feet tall and strongly built and had a sharp eye for the ball, revelling in the drive and hook over square leg. Sugg was shaky at the start of an innings, but once settled hit the ball very hard, and was also an excellent outfielder. England won both Tests that Sugg played in by an innings.

Football career
Sugg first played top-class association football for Bolton Wanderers in the 1882–83 season. However his stay was brief. In 1883–84 Sugg signed for The Wednesday and also captained their team. From November 1884 until March 1885 Sugg played for and captained Derby County. From March 1885 until September 1888 he played for and captained Burnley. Sugg was described by a commentator as a "play anywhere footballer as long as he could play football". Sugg signed for Everton in September 1888.

Playing at centre forward, Sugg made his Everton and League debut on 6 October 1888 at Anfield, the then home of Everton. The visitors were Aston Villa and Everton won 2–0. Sugg appeared in nine of the 22 League matches in the 1888–89 season. He was retained for 1889–90 but only played once, taking his total to ten League appearances without scoring. He returned to Burnley in 1890 but did not play for their first team.

Personal life
Sugg had massive biceps and took part in weightlifting, long-distance swimming and shot put. He also played in the final of the Liverpool amateur billiards championship, won numerous prizes in rifle shooting and held the record for throwing a cricket ball.

Sugg died in Waterloo, Liverpool at the age of 71.

See also
List of English cricket and football players

References

 Bill Frindall, Wisden Book of English Test Cricketers
 Christopher Martin-Jenkins, Who's who of Test Cricketers

External links

 

1862 births
1933 deaths
Derbyshire cricketers
England Test cricketers
English cricketers
Lancashire cricketers
Wisden Cricketers of the Year
Yorkshire cricketers
English footballers
Association football forwards
Bolton Wanderers F.C. players
Sheffield Wednesday F.C. players
Derby County F.C. players
Burnley F.C. players
Everton F.C. players
English Football League players
People from Ilkeston
Footballers from Derbyshire
Cricketers from Derbyshire
North v South cricketers
Players cricketers
Liverpool and District cricketers